Chișoda may refer to one of two places in Timiș County, Romania:

 Chișoda, a village in Giroc Commune
 Chișoda Nouă, the former name of Fratelia district, Timișoara